Dakuta is an Australian band from Brisbane. They formed in 1999.

Discography

Albums

Awards

Q Song Awards
The Queensland Music Awards (previously known as Q Song Awards) are annual awards celebrating Queensland, Australia's brightest emerging artists and established legends. They commenced in 2006.

 (wins only)
|-
| 2006
| "Pulp Funky"
| Rhythm and Blues Song of the Year
| 
|
|-
| LA Music Awards
| "Pulp Funky"
| Rhythm and Blues Best Singer Song Writer
| 
|}

References

External links
 Official site
 LA Music Award Winners Dakuta launch new EP in Sydney & Brisbane (Rave Magazine Article)
 Garage 2 V
 Snaring The Drum Daniel Crichton-Rouse
 Brispop Profile
 The Drum Film Clip (YouTube)
 LA Music Award Winners List 2006
 Qsong Award Winners List 2006
 Band Sails into popularity (Courier Mail)
 Virve TV
 JJJ "Bio"

Australian rock music groups